At least three ships of the French Navy have borne the name Comète:

 , a frigate launched in 1752
 , a frigate launched in 1796 and scrapped in 1810
 , a gunboat that saw action in the Franco-Siamese War of 1893

French Navy ship names